The General Electric Catalyst (formerly Advanced Turboprop, or ATP) is a turboprop engine by GE Aviation.

It was announced on 16 November 2015 and will power the Beechcraft Denali, it first ran on December 22, 2017, and should be certified in 2023.

The  engine aims for 20% better efficiency than its competition thanks to a 16:1 overall pressure ratio, variable stator vanes, cooled turbine blades, 3D printed parts and FADEC.

Development

After introducing the General Electric H80 in 2010 to improve the Walter M601, GE started analyzing its competition and devised a clean-design engine in 2014, then was selected for the Cessna Denali competition.
In September 2015, General Electric created a European turboprop development center, after the US-Exim Bank closure in June, investing over $400 million and creating 500 to 1,000 jobs.
The engine was announced on 16 November 2015 at the National Business Aviation Association's annual tradeshow.

In 2016, the gearbox, power turbine and combustor were to be made in Turin, the rotating components were to be supplied from Warsaw and the final assembly line was planned at Walter Engines in Prague. At the time, major components were split between GE-owned facilities in Poland and Italy, both belonging to Avio Aero. Avio Aero was acquired by GE in 2013.
As of 2021, the Avio Aero website does not list any facility in Warsaw.
It was designed by GE in Europe, and for the power and gas generator turbine, and the high pressure compressor, by the Engineering Design Center in Warsaw, an alliance between General Electric Company Polska and the Warsaw Institute of Aviation.

In October 2017, GE received 85% of the parts, on track to deliver the first test engine by the end of the year.
At this time, the axial-centrifugal compressor vehicle - stator, rotor and cold-section assemblies - was tested in Munich to validate its efficiency, performance and operability.

Testing

After two years of development, it completed its first test run in Prague on December 22, 2017.
After most of the component tested and the engine run, GE Aviation maintains its performance objectives and hope to exceed them.
It will begin certification testing in 2018, validating the aerodynamics, mechanics, and aerothermal systems.
It is expected to power the Beechcraft Denali first flight in late 2018 and will complete over 2000 hours of testing before the Denali enter service.
GE Aviation Czech, the development, testing and production headquarters, has recruited around 180 employees, with another 80 expected in 2018 among 500 others for the complete facility at full production rate.
It was developed over two years by 400 GE designers, engineers and materials experts in the Czech Republic, Italy, Germany, Poland, the U.S. and elsewhere.
Six test cells will open, 10 test engines will be built and it will be flown later in 2018 on a flying testbed, certification tests over 2018-2019 include altitude, performance and high-vibration testing.

In March 2018 the first sample ran nearly 40 hours before several years of health monitoring review.
The next engine is assembled and instrumented for altitude trials and will be tested in Canada from summer 2018.
From later in 2018, Cessna will receive three engines to prepare the first-quarter 2019 Denali maiden flight.
Its development is 30% faster than previous new GE projects as the development program has 10 engines, plus several rebuilds.
Over the next two years, 33 engine tests overall will happen including 17 certification tests.
The certification do not require a flying testbed but a modified King Air 350 may be used for flight safety clearance early in 2019, before Denali flight tests.
At the end of May 2018, 60 hours of testing were completed including at full power while second engine assembly was nearly complete for a summer first run, component certification was imminent and should be followed by whole-engine certification testing, starting with ingestion and altitude tests.
By July 2018, the first engine ran over 100 hours while a second engine is running in Prague before being sent to Canada later in the year for altitude testing, performance is on target or better than predicted.

By October 2019, over 1,000 engine cycles logged 1,600h of tests: 1,200h in test cells and 400h in compressor rigs.
Altitude, endurance, vibration, durability and ingestion testing were complete, as integrated propeller controls tests and high-pressure compressor and gas generator turbine overspeed tests.
New icing tests requirements pushed back the first engine delivery to 2020, and Beechcraft Denali first flight even further.
Five engines were assembled by then, and two other should be completed before 2019 ends.

First flight test aboard a King Air was delayed until spring 2020 and certification for autumn 2021, after a 18-month campaign, due to new FAA testing requirements, including icing tests.

By July 2021, 16 engines had been produced and completed 2,500h of operation; as 30% of Catalyst’s certification tests were completed including some icing tests.
Tests have shown more power at high altitudes than expected and a 1-2% more efficiency than anticipated for up to 16-17% more than competitors.
One turboprop was fitted to a Beechcraft King Air 350 in Berlin which completed some taxi tests, to achieve maiden flight in the coming months and certification by end-2022.
Another engine was installed on a Denali airframe to make its first flight before year-end and to achieve certification in 2023.

The Catalyst made its first flight on a King Air testbed on September 30.
On November 23, the Denali made its first flight with a Catalyst engine, targeting a 2023 certification.

Market

The GE Catalyst is intended to cover the market between the H80 and CT7. It will compete with the Pratt & Whitney Canada PT6, produced at 51,000 units and leading the small turboprop market for 50 years, adding to the sub  General Electric H80. GE plans to invest up to $1 billion in the project, including $400 million for a manufacturing center in Europe.

Design
The  Advanced Turboprop could be extended in an  range. Its 16:1 overall pressure ratio allow a 20% lower fuel burn and 10% higher cruise power than same size class competition with a 4000–6000 hour mean time between overhauls (MTBO). The compressor is derived from the General Electric T700 with four axial stages and a single centrifugal stage, with the same 3D aerodynamics design used in the GE9X. The engine includes variable stator vanes (VSVs) and 3D printed parts.

The reverse-flow single-annular combustor resembles the GE-Honda HF120 design. The two-stage single-crystal high pressure turbine will be the first in this class of engines to be fully cooled. The three-stage low-pressure turbine is contra-rotating. A FADEC integrated propulsion control system will govern both engine and propeller pitch as an entire system.

Twelve 3D-printed parts replace 855 parts: frames, combustor liners, sumps, exhaust case, bearing housings, stationary components in the flowpath, and heat exchangers. Overall weight is reduced by 5% and brake specific fuel consumption is improved by 1%. 3D printing is not used for rotating components such as blades, discs and rotors. 35% of the engine will be printed at GE, reducing the serialized part count to 35. They are printed from a titanium alloy.

The time between overhauls is 4,000 hours, 33% more than its leading competitor.
It is the first turboprop in its class with two stages of variable stator vanes.
It will feature a composite, five-bladed propeller system from McCauley, a subsidiary of Textron.

Turboprops now have to be certificated for high-altitude ice crystal icing: a compressor blisk has to survive an impact from an ice ball.
This would require a 2 lb (1.13kg) heavier first stage and would hamper the engine aerodynamics.
GE proposed channelling to the engine inlet hot oil from an accessory gearbox sump to avoid growing ice and will test this in a Canadian cold weather facility in summer 2018.

Cooled turbines allow over  higher operating temperatures.
Its FADEC, VSVs and a three-stage counter-rotating  turbine generates 10% higher cruise power, maintaining peak efficiency at off-design conditions for better lapse rate and altitude power.
The one-piece sump replaces 45 conventional parts and will be printed in just four days down from 14 initially.

Applications
 Beechcraft Denali
 Eurodrone
 XTI TriFan 600

Specification

See also

References

External links
 GE Catalyst turboprop page
 

2010s turboprop engines
Advanced Turboprop